Lucas Finazzi (born 18 August 1990) is an Italian Brazilian footballer who plays as a midfielder for Italian Serie D club A.C.D. Campodarsego.

Career
Born in Cuiabá, Mato Grosso state, Brazil, Finazzi started his Italian career in A.C. ChievoVerona along with his brother Thiago. Lucas was a member of the reserve from 2007 to 2010 in national "spring" league. Since 2010, L.Finazzi left for Lumezzane in temporary deal along with Roberto Inglese.

On 11 July 2012, Finazzi signed a season-long loan deal with Serie B side Brescia Calcio. The loan deal was renewed on 10 July 2013.

On 28 August 2014 Finazzi was signed by Serie C club Grosseto. on 10 January 2015 he left for fellow third division club Cremonese in temporary deal.

References

External links
 Football.it Profile 
 
 

1990 births
Brazilian emigrants to Italy
People from Cuiabá
Living people
Italian footballers
Association football midfielders
A.C. ChievoVerona players
F.C. Lumezzane V.G.Z. A.S.D. players
Brescia Calcio players
F.C. Grosseto S.S.D. players
U.S. Cremonese players
A.S. Melfi players
U.S. Gavorrano players
U.S. Triestina Calcio 1918 players
Virtus Francavilla Calcio players
Cuiabá Esporte Clube players
Serie B players
Serie C players
Serie D players